Mizanur Rahman Chowdhury (19 October 1928 – 2 February 2006) was a Bengali politician, most notable for serving as Prime Minister of Bangladesh from 9 July 1986, to 27 March 1988.

Personal life 
Chowdhury was born in Chandpur District, in what is now Bangladesh. In college, he was involved in student politics. His father was Muhammad Hafiz Chowdhury and his mother was Mahmuda Chowdhury. He went to high school in Nuria High Madrasa and went to graduate from Feni College in 1952. He was the headmaster of Bamni Junior High School in Noakhali district. He was selected to join the Provincial Public Service Commission and started in government service. He started Nuria High Madrasa in Chandpur as an English teacher after resigning government service.

Chowdhury had a son, Abdullah Mizan.

Mizanur Rahman Chowdhury died in
February 2006 in Birdem Hospital, Dhaka.

Career 
In 1944 he entered politics by joining the All Bengal Muslim Student League. In 1945 he was elected president of Comilla district unit of All India Muslim Students League. In 1946 he was made the Captain of Muslim League Volunteer Corps. He would go on to be elected the general secretary of Chandpur Muslim Chhatra League students union of Chandpur College in 1948, two years later he was elected as general secretary of Feni College students union. He was involved in the 1952 Bengali language movement.

In 1959 he was elected vice chairman of Chandpur Municipality. In 1962, he was elected to the National assembly of Pakistan. In December 1964 he was arrested under the Public Safety Ordinance of Pakistan. He was released before the National Assembly election and went on to be elected again in the assembly in 1965. In 1966 he was elected to the post of organising secretary of East Pakistan Awami League and later was made the acting general secretary. He helped organize the 6-Point Movement. He was chief organising convenor of the Six point movement. On 22 June 1966 he was arrested under Defense of Pakistan Rules. In 1967 released by the order of the Supreme Court. In 1968 was made the convenor of the combined opposition party (COP). In 1969 he helped organize the mass uprising.

He participated in the Liberation War of Bangladesh in 1971 on the pro-independence side. He went with Malek Ukil others to Agartala, Tripura, India to organize the Awami League during the War.  He went to become the first Minister of Information and Radio in 1972 after the independence of Bangladesh. In 1973 he was elected to the Jatiya Sangsad and was made the minister of Rehabilitation. In 1979 he elected to the Jatiya Sangsad. In 1985 he was made the Minister of Post and Telegraph. In 1986 he was again elected to the Jatiya Sangsad. On 8 July 1986 he was made the Prime Minister in the cabinet of President Ershad. His term as Prime Minister ended on 27 March 1988. In 1988 he was again elected to the Jatiya Sangsad and again 1991. He returned to Awami League in 2001 and retained that position for the rest of his life.

References

Further reading
 
 
 
 

1928 births
2006 deaths
Awami League politicians
Jatiya Party politicians
Prime Ministers of Bangladesh
5th Jatiya Sangsad members
Pakistani MNAs 1965–1969
Pakistani MNAs 1962–1965
20th-century Bengalis
People from Chandpur District